Baumruk is a Czech surname.

Notable people with this surname include:
 Jiří Baumruk, Czech basketball player
 Kellie Baumruk, also known as Kellie Gerardi, American space scientist
 Miroslav Baumruk, Czech basketball player
 Petr Baumruk, Czech handball player
 Zdeněk Baumruk, Czechoslovak canoeist